DY, D. Y., Dy, or dy may refer to:

In science and technology, and mathematics

Astronomy 
 DY Persei, a variable star in the Perseus constellation
 DY Persei variable, a subclass of R Coronae Borealis variables
 DY Eridani, a triple star system less than 16.5 light years away from Earth

Other sciences
 , in calculus, Leibniz's notation for the differential of a variable y
 Dysprosium, symbol Dy, a chemical element
 1,4-Dioxane, a common solvent

Businesses
 Norwegian Air Shuttle (IATA code DY)
 Alyemda, a Yemeni airline (IATA code DY, until 1993)
 DY, clothing brand of singer Daddy Yankee

People 
 Dy (surname), a surname in various cultures (including a list of people with the surname)
 DY (rapper) (born 1984), Canadian rapper
 DY, member of the American record production and songwriting team 808 Mafia
 Lady Di, Diana, Princess of Wales

Places 
 DY, the official International vehicle registration code for Benin (formerly Dahomey)
 DY postcode area in Britain
 DY Patil Stadium, a cricket stadium in India
 D. Y. Patil college of Engineering and Technology, Kolhapur in India
 Dee Why, a suburb in Sydney, Australia

Other uses
 dy (digraph), a digraph used in rendering the Xhosa and Shona languages, as well as some Australian Aboriginal languages such as Warlpiri
 Deputy (disambiguation)
 DY, a line of clothing from Puerto Rican singer Daddy Yankee

See also 
 Die (disambiguation)
 Dye (disambiguation)
 YD (disambiguation)